Cafferatta is a town (comuna) in Santa Fe Province, in Caseros Departamento  from Venado Tuerto.

It is named after Juan Manuel Cafferata, 25th Governor of Santa fe Province.

References

Populated places in Santa Fe Province